The National Education Radio (NER) is a government owned radio station in the Taiwan (ROC) and is located in the Zhongzheng District of Taipei City, Taiwan next to the Taipei Botanical Garden and National Museum of History.

History
The radio station was founded on 29 March 1960. The Headquarters building has been a registered historic landmark since 2009.

See also
 Ministry of Education (Taiwan)
 Education in Taiwan
 Press Freedom Index
 Censorship in Taiwan
 Media of Taiwan

References

1960 establishments in Taiwan
Mandarin-language radio stations
Radio stations in Taiwan
Public radio
Buildings and structures in Taipei
Mass media in Taipei
Educational broadcasting
Public broadcasting in Taiwan